Tripidium is a genus of flowering plant in the family  Poaceae, native to Spain, Morocco, Korea and New Guinea. The genus name was first published by Hildemar Wolfgang Scholz in 2006 as a replacement for the illegitimate name Ripidium.

Species
, Plants of the World Online accepted the following species:
Tripidium arundinaceum (Retz.) Welker, Voronts. & E.A.Kellogg
Tripidium bengalense (Retz.) H.Scholz
Tripidium kanashiroi (Ohwi) Welker, Voronts. & E.A.Kellogg
Tripidium procerum (Roxb.) Welker, Voronts. & E.A.Kellogg
Tripidium ravennae (L.) H.Scholz
Tripidium strictum (Host) H.Scholz

References

Andropogoneae
Poaceae genera